The Idaho Standards Achievement Tests (ISAT) is the state achievement test for Idaho It is administered for reading, English language use, and mathematics in grades 3-8 and once in high school. Science is additionally assessed in grades 5 and 7. The ISAT is used to monitor golas state, district, and school monitoring. At this time, Idaho does not use these tests for graduation purposes at any level.

References

Education in Idaho
Standardized tests in the United States
2004 establishments in Idaho